
Gmina Potworów is a rural gmina (administrative district) in Przysucha County, Masovian Voivodeship, in east-central Poland. Its seat is the village of Potworów, which lies approximately 18 kilometres (11 mi) north-east of Przysucha and 82 km (51 mi) south-west of Warsaw.

Villages
Gmina Potworów contains the villages and settlements of Dąbrowa Goszczewicka, Długie, Dłuska Wola, Gackowice, Grabowa, Grabowska Wola, Jamki, Kacperków, Kozieniec, Łojków, Marysin, Mokrzec, Olszany, Podgóry, Pólka, Potworów, Potworów PGR, Rdzów, Rdzuchów, Rdzuchów-Kolonia, Sady, Wir, Wir Stary, Wir-Kolonia, Wirówek, Wymysłów, Żabia Wólka and Zachatka.

Neighbouring gminas
Gmina Potworów is bordered by the gminas of Klwów, Przysucha, Przytyk, Radzanów, Rusinów and Wyśmierzyce.

References
Polish official population figures 2006

Potworow
Przysucha County